Rajkovac (Cyrillic script: Рајковац) may refer to:

Rajkovac (Mladenovac), a village in municipality of Mladenovac, Serbia
Rajkovac (Topola), a village in municipality of Topola, Serbia